Onychonycteridae is an extinct family of bats known only from the early Eocene of Europe and North America. The type species, Onychonycteris finneyi, was described in 2008 from two nearly complete skeletons found in the Green River Formation of southwestern Wyoming. Since that time a number of previously described fossil bat species have been assigned to Onychonycteridae, as well as two more recently discovered species

Most species belonging to Onychonycteridae are known only from isolated teeth and jaw fragments, however, they can be recognized by their relatively square-shaped upper molars, simple lower fourth premolar, and primitive, necromantodont lower molars. Onychonycteris finneyi exhibits additional primitive features of its skeleton, including claws on all five fingers and a simple cochlea that suggests it was incapable of echolocation. The dimensions of its wings suggest it employed a more primitive method of flight than living bats

Genera 
The following genera are assigned to Onychonycteridae:
 Ageina Russell et al., 1973
 Ageina tobieni Russell et al., 1973 - Mutigny (MP 8-9), France
 Eppsinycteris Hooker, 1996
 Eppsinycteris anglica Hooker, 1996 - Abbey Wood (MP 8–9), England
 Honrovits Beard et al., 1992
 Honrovits tsuwape Beard et al., 1992 - Wind River Formation (late Wasatchian), Wyoming
 Marnenycteris Hand et al., 2015
 Marnenycteris michauxi Hand et al., 2015 - Pourcy (Ypresian), France
 Onychonycteris Simmons et al., 2008
 Onychonycteris finneyi Simmons et al., 2008 - Green River Formation (late Wasatchian), Wyoming
 Volactrix? Czaplewski et al., 2022
 Volactrix simmonsae? Czaplewski et al., 2022 - Sheep Pass Formation (Bridgerian), Nevada

The following species may belong to Onychonycteridae according to Smith et al., 2012:

 "Hassianycteris" joeli Smith and Russell, 1992 - Evere (Ypresian), Belgium

References 

Bat families
Eocene bats
Prehistoric bats